Curt Göran Schauman (born 29 August 1940) is a Finnish actor and former sailor who competed in the 1972 Summer Olympics. He was born into a Swedish-speaking family in Helsinki, and his father  was also an actor. In 1992, Schauman was awarded the Pro Finlandia medal.

References

External links
 
 

1940 births
Living people
Finnish male sailors (sport)
Olympic sailors of Finland
Sailors at the 1972 Summer Olympics – Dragon
20th-century Finnish male actors
21st-century Finnish male actors
Finnish male film actors
Finnish male television actors
Male actors from Helsinki
Pro Finlandia Medals of the Order of the Lion of Finland
Sportspeople from Helsinki
Swedish-speaking Finns